

Awards

Best Song
Amaia Montero — "Quiero Ser"
Macaco — "Moving"
Carlos Baute (featuring Marta Sánchez)— "Colgando En Tus Manos"
Melendi — "Piratas del Bar Caribe"
Efecto Mariposa — "Por Quererte"

Best Video
Nena Daconte — "El Aleph"
Zenttric — "Solo Quiero Bailar"
Second — "Rincón Exquisito"
Macaco — "Moving"
Fito & Fitipaldis — "Antes de Que Cuente Diez"

Best Album
Amaia Montero — Amaia Montero
Pignoise — Cuestión de Directo
La Quinta Estación — Sin Frenos
Pereza — Aviones
Macaco — Puerto Presente

Best Solo
Macaco
Amaia Montero
Carlos Baute
Antonio Orozco
Fito & Fitipaldis

Best Group
Nena Daconte
El Sueño de Morfeo
Pereza
Efecto Mariposa
La Quinta Estación

Best New Act
Zenttric
Second
Ilsa
Calle Paris
Ragdog

Best Tour
The Killers — Tour 09
Melendi — Curiosa la Cara de Tu Padre Tour
U2 — U2 360° Tour
Enrique Bunbury — Helville de Tour
Valladolid Latino

Best Argentine Act
Teen Angels
Axel
Fidel Nadal
Babasónicos
Miranda!

Best Chilean Act
Kata Palacios
Sinergia
Movimiento Original
Zk y Crac MC
Chancho en Piedra

Best Colombian Act
Jerau
Andrés Cepeda
Santiago Cruz
Mauricio & Palodeagua
Fanny Lú

Best Costa Rican Act
El Parque
Akasha
Esteban Calderón
Mechas
Gandhi

Best Ecuadorian Act
Fausto Miño
Xauxa Kings
Israel Brito
Daniel Betancour
Mirella Cesa

Best Guatemalan Act
Duo Sway
Fabiola
Bohemia Suburbana
Viento en Contra
El Clubo

Best Mexican Act
Jot Dog
Paulina Rubio
Zoé
Gloria Trevi
Ximena Sariñana

Best Panamanian Act
Mario Spinalli
Alejandro Lagrotta
Ivan Barrios
Post
Cienfue

Best Latin Song
Nelly Furtado — "Manos Al Aire"
Tiziano Ferro (featuring Amaia Montero) — "El Regalo Más Grande"
Shakira — "Loba"
Luis Fonsi — "No Me Doy Por Vencido"
Paulina Rubio — "Causa y Efecto"

Best Latin Act
Ha*Ash
Paulina Rubio
Luis Fonsi
Shakira
Nelly Furtado

Best International Song
Jason Mraz — "I'm Yours"
James Morrison — "Broken Strings"
Lady Gaga — "Poker Face"
Alesha Dixon — "The Boy Does Nothing"
The Black Eyed Peas — "I Gotta Feeling"

Best International Act
The Killers
The Black Eyed Peas
Beyoncé
Jason Mraz
Amy McDonald

Live performances
40's The Musical
Robbie Williams — "Bodies / You Know Me / Feel"
Carlos Baute and Marta Sánchez — "Colgando En Tus Manos"
Amaia Montero — "Te Voy A Decir Una Cosa / 4" / Quiero Ser"
Macaco — "Moving / Tengo"
Alesha Dixon — "Breathe Slow / The Boy Does Nothing"
Estopa — "Como Camarón"
Teen Angels — "Quién"
Paulina Rubio — "Causa y Efecto / Ni Rosas Ni Juguetes"
James Morrison (featuring Nelly Furtado) — "Get to You / Broken Strings"
Nelly Furtado — "Más / Manos Al Aire"
David Bisbal — "Esclavo de Sus Besos"
Pixie Lott — "Mama Do (Uh Oh, Uh Oh)"
Mika — "Rain / Grace Kelly"
Shakira — "Loba / Lo Hecho Está Hecho"

2009 music awards
Los Premios 40 Principales
2009 in Spanish music